Ada Holly Shissler is an Associate Professor of Ottoman and Modern Turkish History in the Department of Near Eastern Languages and Civilizations at the University of Chicago and former Director of the Center for Middle Eastern Studies at the University of Chicago.

Professor Shissler graduated from the University of California, Los Angeles (UCLA), under the guidance of the great Ottoman historian Stanford Shaw.  Her dissertation on Ahmet Ağaoğlu was recently published by I.B. Tauris.  After obtaining her PhD, she taught at Indiana University of Pennsylvania, before coming to the University of Chicago.  In addition to her professorial duties, she also served as Director of the Center for Middle Eastern Studies at the University of Chicago from 2007 to 2009, having previously served as assistant director from 2004 to 2007.  Professor Shissler's research interests include: Ottoman History, History of the Early Turkish Republic, Modern Middle Eastern History, Nationalism, and Intellectual History in general.

Published works

Between Two Empires: Ahmet Ağaoğlu and the New Turkey.  New York: I.B. Tauris, 2002.

See also
Center for Middle Eastern Studies at the University of Chicago

Islamic scholars

External links
 http://www.cmes.uchicago.edu - Center for Middle Eastern Studies website (University of Chicago)
 https://web.archive.org/web/20070220232458/http://humanities.uchicago.edu/depts/nelc/facultypages/shissler/index.html - Department of Near Eastern Languages and Civilizations page

Middle Eastern studies in the United States
Historians of Turkey
University of Chicago faculty
Living people
Year of birth missing (living people)
Scholars of Ottoman history
University of California, Los Angeles alumni
Indiana University of Pennsylvania faculty